John Quenby (born 30 October 1941) has been one of the most influential figures in British motorsport becoming Chief Executive of the RAC Motor Sports Association (1990-2001), the official governing body of motorsport in the UK, a director of the Auto-Cycle Union (1995–98), Chairman of the Speedway Control Board (1998-2002) and former Chairman of the Motorcycle Circuit Racing Control Board (1995-2000).

Biography
Educated at Bedford Modern School and the Open University, Quenby started his business career with Granada plc becoming managing director of Granada Overseas Holdings Limited and holding numerous other directorships at subsidiary companies of Granada.  In 1990 he became Chief Executive of the RAC Motor Sports Association, the official governing body of motorsport in the United Kingdom, a position he held until 2001.  He was also a director of the Auto-Cycle Union (1995–98), Chairman of the Speedway Control Board (1998-2002) and former Chairman of the Motorcycle Circuit Racing Control Board (1995-2000). Since his retirement, Quenby has been the branch Chairman of The Royal British Legion and Chairman of the Friends of the Intelligence Corps Museum since 2011.  He is a member of the MCC and the RAC Club.

References

1941 births
Living people
English motorsport people
British motorsport people
Alumni of the Open University
People educated at Bedford Modern School